Endheu Kléber Nesiyama (born 28 March 1990), commonly known as Japa, is a former Brazilian footballer.

Career statistics

Club

References

1990 births
Living people
Brazilian people of Japanese descent
Footballers from São Paulo
Brazilian footballers
Japanese footballers
Association football forwards
S.C. Espinho players
S.C. Covilhã players
F.C. Oliveira do Hospital players
Brazilian expatriate footballers
Brazilian expatriate sportspeople in Portugal
Japanese expatriate footballers
Japanese expatriate sportspeople in Portugal
Expatriate footballers in Portugal